Nick Joseph DiMartino (born November 11, 1946) is a Seattle-based author, playwright, book reviewer and bookseller.  To date he has published 15 novels, 2 non-fiction books and has had over 20 plays in full production.  Many of his books feature local characters and settings.  His plays are often treatments of classic books.

History
DiMartino was born in Long Beach, California to Ernesto DiMartino (1922–2012), a second-generation Seattle fruit-and-vegetable merchant and later realtor, and Mamie Lombard DiMartino (1924–2019). Little Nick was named for his grandfather Nicola, but these days the Italian form of the name is usually feminine, so his parents baptized him just Nick (not Nicola or Nicholas). When Nick was six months old the family moved back to Seattle to stay. He attended Maple Elementary School, Cleveland High School, and the University of Washington where he majored in English Literature.  After graduating from U.W. in 1969, he attended one semester of graduate school on a full scholarship at Johns Hopkins University before returning to Seattle and going to work at University Book Store, where he became a book buyer.  He has used this position to make sure classic books always remain on the shelves, despite the higher profit margins of Washington Huskies sports clothing.

From his first published work, a one-act play called The Polar Bear (which won Scholastic Magazine's First Prize when he was just 18), Nick has completed 55 books and authored over 24 plays.

His play Frankenstein has been performed by the Honolulu Theatre for Youth, First Stage Children's Theater in Milwaukee, Dallas Children's Theater, twice at Nashville Children's Theatre and twice at Louisville's Stage One, where it was videotaped in 1997 by the BBC and released as a family theatre video by Globalstage to great reviews.

Nick's Picks
In 2001 DiMartino began a 'book-of-the-month' feature at the seven branches of University Book Store, creating signage and promotion for the best newly released international title.  Since then his 'Picks' have been prominently featured every month for over fourteen years.

Nick's Book Club
In 2003 the Nick's Pick promotion expanded into a discussion group at UBS for each featured book, which has met for over twelve years now. When The Kite Runner was chosen in 2003, his club members attended the first Seattle autograph party for its author Khaled Hosseini. Other authors who have visited Nick's Book Club include Marjane Satrapi, Rory Stewart, and Alison Bechdel.

Shelf Awareness
Starting in June 2007 DiMartino has reviewed international fiction for Shelf-Awareness.com, the daily online newszine for booksellers and book-lovers. To date Shelf Awareness has published over 250 of his reviews.

Booklist
Between 2007 and 2009 Nick contributed 126 articles to the online Booklist Reader from Booklist Publications.

Seattle Gay and Lesbian Book Club
In January 2009 DiMartino founded The Seattle Gay & Lesbian Book Club, which meets weekly to discuss each month's featured current or classic novel (or memoir) relating to life as a gay person.

Works

Fiction
 1973 Eye of the Dragon 
 1974 The Other Side of the Bay – published in ‘’Shadows and Silence’’, Ashtray Press, 2000
 1975 Marco 
 1976 Purgatorio 
 1976 New World Symphony 
 1977 Barnaby Rune and the Gargoyles 
 1978 The Shoemaker and the Elves  
 1980 Madeline Usher 
 1985 Snark! 
 1986 Joseph Golem 
 1986 Sindbad 
 1987 Golden Ass 
 1987 The Red Forest – Pacific Northwest Writers’ Conference – 2nd Prize
 1988 The Seattle Exchange 
 1989 Sand-Clock Boy 
 1989 Gilgamesh 
 1990 The Ugly Duckling 
 1990 Lord of the Squirrels 
 1990 Dead Tourist: Unidentified 
 1991 Bridge of Black Glass 
 1992 Were 
 1993 Diet 
 1993 Student Union 
 1993 A Mall and the Night Visitor 
 1994 Red 
 1994 Bookworm 
 1995 Eternal Light 
 1995 Hot Glue — The Day Seattle Burned 
 1996 
 1997 
 1998 
 1998 The Ravine: A Seattle Ghost Story (audiobook)
 1999 Personals
 2000 The Fence 
 2000 Shameless 
 2001 Out Of Control 
 2001 Straight 
 2002 Turn Away From The Sun 
 2003 Family Wrecking 
 2004 Pineapple Moon 
 2005 Love in the American Empire 
 2009 How To Be Positive 
 2010 That Human Weakness 
 2011  
 2011 
 2012 
 2012 
 2012 
 2013 
 2013  
 2013 
 2014 
 2014 
 2015  
 2015 
 2015

Non-Fiction
 2012  
 2012

Plays
 The Polar Bear (1965) - Scholastic Magazine First Prize
 Treasure Island (1974) - Seattle Junior Programs
 Raven (1975) – Red Earth Performing Arts Company
 Atlante (1976) – Red Earth Performing Arts Company
 Dracula (1982) – Seattle Children's Theatre
 Alice in Wonderland (1982) – Bellevue Children's Theatre
 Families: A Musical (1983) – Seattle Children's Theatre
 Pinocchio (1983) – Seattle Children's Theatre
 Frankenstein (1983) – Honolulu Theatre for Youth
 Ozma of Oz (1983) – Bellevue Children's Theatre
 Rama (1984) – Bellevue Children's Theatre
 The Snow Queen (1984) – Seattle Children's Theatre
 Raven The Hungry (1984) – Honolulu Theatre for Youth
 The Wizard of Oz (1988) – Village Theatre, Issaquah
 Stop The Wedding! (1988) – New City Theatre Playwrights Festival finalist, 1999 Hugo House Playwriting Competition finalist
 Snow White (1989) – Pittsburgh Playhouse Junior
 Aladdin (1990) – Pittsburgh Playhouse Junior
 Closed Door (1990)
 Sodom: The Musical (1993)
 Snow White (1993) – First Stage Children's Theater, Milwaukee
 Babes in Toyland (1994) – Village Theatre, Issaquah
 The Sampo (1999) – FinnFest USA ’99
 Christmas Ghost Story (2000)
 Socrates (Never Fall in Love With a Beautiful Boy) (2001)
 Troublemaker's Mother (2010) – Finlandia Foundation
 Gildong (2016) pre-production

Films
 Frankenstein (Stage One, Louisville Kentucky for Globalstage, 1997)

See also
 Official Nick DiMartino website
 Goodreads profile
 UBS Shelf Life
 NW Booksellers profile
 Shelf Awareness profile
 Book Lust Interview by Nancy Pearl
 Archived articles for Booklist 2007–2009

References

Living people
1946 births
University of Washington College of Arts and Sciences alumni
20th-century American writers
21st-century American writers
20th-century American male writers